Thesni Khan is an Indian actress who appears in Malayalam films, television, and stage. She made her acting debut through Daisy in 1988. She is widely known for the portrayal of character roles. In 2020, she contested in the second season of Malayalam reality TV series Bigg Boss. Thesni is currently an active celebrity vlogger on the YouTube channel "Thezbeen's".

Personal life

Her father, Ali Khan, was a magician. In her early days, Thesni used to assist her father during magic shows conducted on various stages. She later studied at Cochin Kalabhavan.

Filmography

Television serials

Dramas
 Atham Pathinu Ponnonam

 Other Works
She has judged popular reality show Comedy Stars on Asianet,Five Minutes Fun Star on Kaumudi TV and Jagapoga on Kairali TV..She has attended popular talk shows such as Nammal Thammil,Sreekandannair Show. She has acted in some tele-films also. She has participated in popular game shows such as 1.1.3 on Mazhavil Manorama and Sarigama on Asianet. She has supported Beena Antony and Manoj Kumar in reality show Sundari Neeyum Sundaran Njaanum on Asianet. She has performed in various stages
as a dancer,comedy artist, supporting artist, etc. She knows magic very much. She has acted in some advertisements also. She also contested in the reality show Bigg Boss (Malayalam season 2) on Asianet, hosted by actor Mohanlal. She entered the house on 5 January 2020 on day-1 as one among the 17 housemates and was evicted on day-27.

Other shows 

 2020: Bigg Boss (Malayalam season 2)
 Onavillu Bigg Boss Mamangam
 Asianet BB Dhamaka
 Amma Mazhavillu 
 Vanitha Magazine
 Ladies Corner
 Star Jam (Kappa TV) 
 Ningalkkariyamo?(Surya TV)
 Ruchiyude Onam
 Comedy Time (Surya TV)
 Star Ragging (Kairali TV)
 Thesni Magic Show
 Snehitha Arangu Segment (Amrita TV) 
 Valkkanadi (Asianet)
 Shubharahtri (Jeevan TV)
 Art Cafe (Kairali People TV)
 Onnara Ruchi
 CCL
 I Personally
 Ente Katha
 Gulumal
 Taste Time (Asianet)
 Ividinganannu Bhai (Mazhavil Manorama)
 Badai Bungalow Asianet)
 Chat Room (Jaihind TV)
 Cinema Chirimaa (Mazhavil Manorama)
 Nammal Thammil (Asianet)
 Kerala Cafe (Kairali TV)
 Cinema Company (Kaumudi TV)
 Students Only (Kairali TV)
 E Buz (Mathrubhumi News)
 Students Only (Kairali TV)
 Don't DO Don't do (Asianet Plus)
 Meet The Editors (Reporter TV)
 Chirikkum Pattanam (Kairali TV)
 Smart Show (Flowers TV)
 Home Minister (Amrita TV)
 Annachi Paattu
 La Jihad
 I Me Myself
 Run Kerala Run
 Spotligt
 Aakruti
Komady Circus (Mazhavil Manorama)
Comedy Awards (Flowers TV)
Ningalkkum Aakaam Kodeeshwaran
Anand Film Awards
Grand Magical Circus
Day with a star
Urvashi Theatres
Adar Onam
Onnanu Nammal
De Maveli Kombath
Nakshathrathilakkam
 Comedy Sthreekal
 JB Junction
 Vanitha
 Indiaglitz
 Start Music Aaradhyam Padum
 Start Music Season 3
 Comedy Utsavam
 Meet My Guest
 Panajri Pradhaman
 Make Over
 Icebreak with Veena
 Kalabhavan Ormakalum Pinne Njangalum
 Kutty Chef
 Valentines Corner
 Let's Rock N Roll
 Parayam Nedam
 Red Carpet
 Funs Upon A Time
 Comedy Masters
 Flowers Oru Kodi
 Panam Tharum Padam

References

External links

Indian film actresses
Indian television actresses
Indian stage actresses
Living people
Actresses from Kochi
Actresses in Malayalam cinema
20th-century Indian actresses
21st-century Indian actresses
Year of birth missing (living people)
Actresses in Malayalam theatre
Actresses in Malayalam television
Indian voice actresses
Bigg Boss Malayalam contestants